Acestrus is an extinct genus of prehistoric bony fish that lived during the lower Eocene in Europe.

See also

 Prehistoric fish
 List of prehistoric bony fish

References

Prehistoric perciform genera
Eocene fish
Eocene fish of Europe